Berestella is a genus of wood midges in the family Cecidomyiidae. The only described species - Berestella insuperabilis - is only known from Rovno amber from the Late Eocene. The genus was established in 2007 and named for Ukrainian entomologist Zoya L. Berest.

References

Cecidomyiidae genera

Insects described in 2007
Taxa named by Zoya A. Fedotova
Taxa named by Evgeny Perkovsky
Diptera of Europe
Fossil taxa described in 2007